Solute carrier family 26 member 6 is a protein that in humans is encoded by the SLC26A6 gene. It is an anion-exchanger expressed in the apical membrane of the kidney proximal tubule, the apical membranes of the duct cells in the pancreas, and the villi of the duodenum.

This gene belongs to the solute carrier 26 family, whose members encode anion transporter proteins. This particular family member encodes a protein involved in transporting chloride, oxalate, sulfate and bicarbonate. Several alternatively spliced transcript variants of this gene, encoding distinct isoforms, have been described, but the full-length nature of some of these variants has not been determined.

Associated diseases 
Diseases associated with SLC26A6 include sialolithiasis and urolithiasis.

See also
 Solute carrier family

References

Further reading

Solute carrier family